Old Town is a small section of Augusta, Georgia. It is located in Richmond County, Georgia.

External links
 Old Town, GA

Geography of Augusta, Georgia